Ben 10 is an American media franchise created by Man of Action Studios, produced by Cartoon Network Studios and owned by Warner Bros. Discovery. The series centers on a boy named Ben Tennyson who acquires the Omnitrix, an alien device resembling a wristwatch, which contains DNA of different alien species. Using the Omnitrix, Ben can transform into powerful aliens with various abilities. The Omnitrix initially contains ten aliens, although later on Ben obtains more species by adding and unlocking their DNA.

The Ben 10 franchise has received widespread critical acclaim, winning 3 Emmy Awards. It consists primarily of 5 television series and 5 films, the latter of which aired between August 2007 and October 2020. Spanning over 16 years, it is Cartoon Network's longest-running franchise to date. There is also a Ben 10 toy line manufactured by Bandai for the first four shows and Playmates Toys for the reboot.

On February 17, 2021, it was announced that three 44-minute specials based on the series would premiere in April 2021: titled Ben 10,010, Ben Gen 10 and Alien X-Tinction, serving as the series finale to the 2016 reboot and a crossover between the first four television series in the franchise.

Television series

Ben 10 (2005 TV series)

The series centers on Ben Tennyson, a 10-year-old boy on a summer vacation road trip with his cousin Gwen and their grandfather Max, who is later revealed to be a member of a secret intergalactic organization called the Plumbers. On their first night camping in their grandfather's RV, nicknamed the Rust Bucket, Ben finds a mysterious watch-like alien device that attaches itself upon his wrist, giving him the ability to transform into several (initially ten but later more) alien life-forms, each with special abilities. During their vacation, the Tennysons are attacked by various enemies, ranging from aliens such as intergalactic warlord Vilgax, bounty hunter duo Sixsix and Kraab, and Ectonurite high king Zs'skayr, criminals such as 11-year-old energy absorbing delinquent Kevin Levin, mad scientist Doctor Animo, and the mysterious paramilitary organization the Forever Knights, to supernatural entities such as interdimensional sorcerer Hex and his niece Charmcaster, and clown mastermind Zombozo and his Circus Freak Trio.

Ben 10: Alien Force

The series begins five years after the events of the original series. Ben has removed the Omnitrix and returned to living a normal life, but he is forced to use it again to save his grandfather Max, who has been abducted by a xenophobic alien species called the Highbreeds as part of a plot to rid the Earth of human beings. Ben's age causes the Omnitrix to reboot, granting him access to new aliens along with a few from the original series. Ben is joined by Gwen and former enemy Kevin Levin as they fight the Highbreed's universal extermination plan.

Ben 10: Ultimate Alien

After Ben's last battle with Vilgax, which destroyed the Omnitrix, Ben replaces it with the Ultimatrix, a device which allows him to evolve his alien forms into their ultimate forms. With the recent public reveal of his identity, Ben has become a worldwide celebrity. Meanwhile, Ben, Gwen, and Kevin must stop an Osmosian villain named Aggregor, who hunts aliens from the Andromeda Galaxy and intends to use their powers to achieve the "ultimate prize". Later, Ben, Gwen, and Kevin have to prevent an extra-dimensional demonic entity called Dagon from taking over the universe.

Ben 10: Omniverse

Ben Tennyson acquires the new and perfected Omnitrix, which gives him access to another new set of aliens along with all of the previous ones. After Gwen goes away to college with Kevin accompanying her, Ben pairs up with Rook Blonko, a by-the-book Plumber from the planet Revonnah. He is targeted by an intergalactic huntsman named Khyber, who has a copy of the Omnitrix, the Nemetrix, with the help of mad scientist Dr. Psychobos. Both of them are working with an enemy from Ben's past, a corrupted Galvanic Mechamorph named Malware. Ben later contends with Vilgax, the Incurseans, Albedo, Zs'Skayr, Psyphon, Charmcaster, the Plumber's Black-Ops Unit (called the "Rooters"), his alternate dimension self Mad Ben, and the rogue Chronosapien Maltruant.

Ben 10 (2016 TV series)

The official Twitter feed of Cartoon Network PR confirmed a rebooted series that would return to following the adventures of Ben, Gwen, and Max Tennyson and feature new alien forms. In mid-June 2016, Cartoon Network released the first poster for the series, in which ten of the most popular aliens from the franchise were featured. The series would premiere on international Cartoon Networks beginning in October 2016, with Europe, Asia-Pacific, Middle East & African versions, and continuing into 2017 with the North and Latin American versions.

The world premiere was on Cartoon Network (Australia and New Zealand), airing on October 1, 2016. The U.K network premiered the series on October 8, 2016. The German Cartoon Network premiered the first two episodes on October 10, 2016. The series premiered in the United States on April 10, 2017.

Future
On June 14, 2011, producer Joel Silver announced that he, along with Warner Bros. and Dark Castle Entertainment, would be working on a film version of Ben 10. In January 2012, Albert Torres was announced as screenwriter. In February 2013, Ryan Engle was announced to work on Torres' script. Andrew Rona, Steve Richards, and Joel Silver were producers. Alex Heineman and Sarah Meyer were executive producers. As of March 2023, no update has been given about the film. 

In 2013, in response to fan questioning about rumors of a Gwen 10 spin-off series, Man of Action confirmed they were actively working with a Japanese anime company to develop a series that would "just follow Gwen without any Ben" as they attend college, retaining her boyfriend Kevin Levin as a supporting character, citing the character's greater popularity in Asia compared to Ben as the reason for the solo series entering development. Despite this, no update on the Gwen 10 Spinoff has been given as of 2023. 

According to Duncan Rouleau, Cartoon Network has plans they are working on right now. He hoped that there would be some announcements by the end of 2021, but as of March 2023, no announcement has been made so far. The crew was developing many options; the changing fields of platforms from cable to streaming, the consolidation of Warner Bros. franchises, and a "thousand other factors" determined where, how, and when this iteration will finally settle.

Cast and characters

The main characters include Ben Tennyson and his cousin Gwen Tennyson, Grandpa Max Tennyson, Kevin Levin, Rook Blonko, and Professor Paradox along with the villains Vilgax, Aggregor, Eon, Doctor Animo, Hex, and Khyber.

Films

Ben 10: Secret of the Omnitrix
The first film is a regular animated feature called Secret of the Omnitrix. During a fight with Dr Animo, Ben's Omnitrix accidentally sets off its self-destruct mode and Ben has to find the Omnitrix's creator to shut it down and stop the evil Vilgax.

Ben 10: Race Against Time

The second is a live-action film titled Ben 10: Race Against Time, which aired November 21, 2007. It revolves around Ben, Gwen, and Grandpa Max (in another dimension)  returning to their hometown of Bellwood and attempting to adjust to being "normal" again. Unfortunately, their lives are once again disrupted by a mysterious alien known as Eon. It premiered on Cartoon Network on November 21, 2007. The film was directed by Alex Winter. The film was nominated for two Visual Effects Society Awards: Outstanding Visual Effects in a Broadcast Miniseries, Movie or SpecialDina Benadon, Evan Jacobs, Brent Young, Chris Christman; and Outstanding Animated Character in a Live Action Broadcast Program or CommercialBrent Young, Michael Smith.

Ben 10: Alien Swarm

The third is a live-action film titled Ben 10: Alien Swarm which aired November 25, 2009. In the movie, the group stumbles upon a hive of alien nanobots who are controlled by a single consciousness and are using humans as host bodies to take over the world. Ben and his friends work together to stop them. This movie is also when Ben unlocks Nanomech.

Ben 10 : Destroy All Aliens

A CGI movie titled Ben 10: Destroy All Aliens was announced in mid-2011, and released on March 11, 2012 (Asia/Philippines) and on March 23, 2012 (US). This film had previously been under the working title Ben 10: Alien Dimensions.  The film was based on the original series, and featured the original voice cast. The CGI was animated by Tiny Island Productions in Singapore.

Ben 10 Versus the Universe: The Movie 
On February 19, 2020, Cartoon Network announced that a film based on the reboot of the show which is now released on October 10, 2020.

Crossovers

Ben 10 Generator Rex crossover

During Cartoon Network's panel at 2011's San Diego Comic-Con, Ben 10 and Generator Rex creators "Man of Action" announced a crossover special between the Ben 10 and Generator Rex series titled Ben 10/Generator Rex: Heroes United. The forty-minute special aired on November 25, 2011, as a Generator Rex episode.

A comic book based on the special titled "Hero Times Two" was released on November 30, 2011, as the 65th issue of DC Comics' Cartoon Network: Action Pack.

A second crossover titled Ben Gen 10 aired as a part of the 5th and last season of the Ben 10 reboot and featured new versions of several Generator Rex characters in the reboot universe.

Ben 10 The Secret Saturdays crossover
With the exception of VV Argost, all of the characters from The Secret Saturdays were completely recast in the Ben 10 Omniverse episode TGIS, which takes place after the end of The Secret Saturdays. Drew Saturday also appeared in a later episode of Ben 10: Omniverse.

Crossover Nexus (Ben 10/Teen Titans Go!/Steven Universe/OK K.O.! Let's Be Heroes crossover)
An extended episode of OK K.O.! Let's Be Heroes featured guest appearances from Ben Tennyson from the 2016 Ben 10 reboot, Garnet from Steven Universe, and Raven from Teen Titans Go!, alongside several legacy characters from past Cartoon Network shows.

Elements of the franchise

Omnitrix

The Omnitrix, its Ultimatrix replacement, and the "finalized" version that is the New Omnitrix are the central elements of the Ben 10 story. They are all wristwatch-styled devices developed by the Galvan inventor Azmuth that transforms the user into any one of many alien beings (originally 1,000,906, but the number has increased by 9 via scanning additional species not originally in the database). Despite many seeing the Omnitrix as a weapon, its true purpose was to allow the beings of the universe to understand each other and to resurrect intelligent species that may go extinct.

The Omnitrix appears in the first two incarnations of the franchise (Ben 10 and Ben 10: Alien Force), but Ben had to destroy it and use the Ultimatrix in the Ultimate Alien series. The Ultimatrix had most of the same functionality as the Omnitrix, but would allow the user to transform the alien into its Ultimate Form (how the species and its DNA would evolve in a one-million-year simulation). In the final episode of Ultimate Alien, Azmuth takes the Ultimatrix from Ben and replaces it with the New Omnitrixthe original version has been a prototype.

In Ben 10: Omniverse, the Nemetrix, a knock-off of the original Omnitrix, is introduced. Unlike the Omnitrix and its succeeding models, the Nemetrix uses the DNA of the natural predators of sentient alien races which have the sole purpose of hunting Ben. Thus, only an animal can use the Nemetrix, as users of higher intelligence are unable to use it without incurring mental damage. In Omniverse, Albedo recreates the Ultimatrix by using a Polymorphic Crystal to stabilize his transformations, making it so that he can stay in any form as long as he wants. It also allows him to transform into the Ultimate Forms of his aliens without first turning into their normal forms.

In the Reboot series, Ben's Omnitrix can augment enhancements onto his aliens. In Season 2, his aliens can become "Omni-Enhanced" with rock-like constructs and energy. However, the enhancements seems to happen at random. This energy is later revealed to be coming from a new alien species in his Omnitrix, which eventually gets its own form, "Shock Rock". In Season 4, Ben unlocks the "Omni-Kix" feature, which allows him to add armor plating onto his aliens. 
The Reboot series also introduces the Antitrix, which is wielded by Kevin Levin. The Antitrix allows Kevin to transform into 11 aliens, most of which are ones that Ben has used before, but significantly altered from Ben's version.

Plumbers
The Plumbers is an organization composed of both human and alien members, each of whom possesses a special badge. All badges bear the intergalactic peace symbol, a green hourglass shape, which is on the faceplate of the Omnitrix. Later, in Omniverse, the Plumbers' symbol becomes a red dot. As the name suggests, they are usually working underground under pipes, drains, and sewers where they are hidden from human contact and the outside world.

In the original series, the Earth's Plumbers were a secret government organization that protected the universe from any threat. Their main base is located inside Mount Rushmore (where the Null Void projector and Sub-Energy were stored), with additional bases located inside Fort Knox, the Space Needle, Devils Tower, the Navajo Monument, the Great Dismal Swamp, and major cities such as Roswell, New York City, New Orleans, Denver, Los Angeles, Chicago, Orlando, and Grand Rapids. Their main adversary was Vilgax. Max Tennyson was a Plumber in his youth. Most of the Plumbers on Earth have disbanded; however, a few members remain in a semi-active capacity.

Forever Knights
The Forever Knights are a British secret society/cult first formed during the Middle Ages that are dedicated to collecting and studying alien technology, usually by illegal means. Any aliens they capture along the way are dissected and studied, and any humans caught with them are deemed worthless and disposed of. They also have a robotic dragon that protects one of their castles. It is revealed in Ultimate Alien that the reason for their actions is to combat Diagon, an entity from another dimension that nearly conquered the Earth in the Middle Ages were it not for the Forever Knights' immortal Founder George. When George left them, the Forever Knights began to splinter under various self-titled Forever Kings who transformed their knights' duty into a genocidal policy toward anything alien, leading to xenophobia, discrimination, and racism towards other species of aliens from other planets by human beings.

The reboot would feature a recurring individual with the organization's name as an antagonist during the third season, with a similar goal in preventing alien contact with earth from ever occurring.

Transports
Each series has featured some kind of main transportation. The wheeled motor vehicles, appearing like normal cars, are equipped with several pieces of Plumber technology such as a turbo engine, laser guns, and autopilot. They are often destroyed during the series.

The Rustbucket and the Rustbucket II, is an old RV resembling a 1973 GMC motorhome owned by Max Tennyson. Despite being old, and even having been destroyed a few times, Max has great affection for it.

The Resolute is Tetrax Shard's spaceship

The Chimearan Hammer is Vilgax's spaceship

Ship is a Galvanic Mechamorph (Upgrade's species) that can transform himself into fully operational technology he's once touched. He merged with the Forever Knights spaceship and became the space transportation for Ben's team during the third season of Alien Force.

The Rustbucket III, a Plumbers' jet that Kevin has upgraded with alien tech, later replaced him.

Kevin's car is a Muscle car resembling a Dodge Challenger armed with Plumber technology as well as other various alien techs, including guns and off-road capabilities. It is the team's main transport in Alien Force and Ultimate Alien. It is damaged or destroyed often, mainly during fights or chase scenes, and Kevin is constantly busy repairing it. In Omniverse, after Ben destroyed it while aiming at Upgrade, Kevin gave it a new look. He painted it blue and placed a white circle with the number 11 on it, with only one stripe.

The Proto-TRUK is Rook's spaceship and the team's main transport in Omniverse. It can transform into a small truck to camouflage itself among Earth vehicles. It was later destroyed and its parts were used by Ben 10,000 to build the Time Cycles.

Accolades

Original series

Race Against Time

Alien Force

Alien Swarm

Ultimate Alien

Omniverse

Spin-off media

Merchandise

Following the success of the Ben 10 animated TV series and films, various Ben 10 merchandise has been released for general sale. These items include comic books, board games, card games (such as Top Trumps), toys, video games, Lego construction sets, bedding, coloring books, footwear, and watches (the Omnitrix and the Ultimatrix). All four shows have been released on DVD.

Video games
The game franchise has many different formats. The video games franchise started in 2006 with the release of Ben 10 for the HyperScan, while the franchise's first official video game Protector of Earth came out in 2007. Twelve games have been released:

Toy line
Bandai manufactured Ben 10 toys from the first four series, while Playmates Toys has produced toys for the 2016 reboot.

Six construction sets were produced by LEGO, depicting Spidermonkey, Humunousaur, Swampfire, Chromastone, Jet Ray, and Big Chill.

The series received three McDonald's Happy Meal promotions internationally, as well as one in America in August 2011. The toys are colored translucent figures of some Omnitrix/Ultimatrix aliens and their Ultimate forms, with a small photo of Ben inside. The Alien Force toys are four rings, each one is an alien (Goop, Jetray, Alien X, Chromastone) with features linked with their powers.

Comic books
Developed by Jason Hall, Min G. Kuand and Heroic Age, the Ben 10 comic revolves around Ben's summer vacation with Gwen and their Grandpa Max, travelling in the Rust Bucket. The Ben 10: Alien Force comic revolves around Ben, with Gwen and a reformed Kevin, battling the Highbreed and the DNAliens.

Cartoon Network Action Pack was a 2006–2012 comic book series made by DC Comics which showcased Ben 10 alongside Samurai Jack, Codename Kids Next Door, The Secret Saturdays, or Generator Rex. Some of the issues were connected with the franchise, while others are non-canon.

In February 2013, IDW Publishing announced a partnership with Cartoon Network to produce comics based on Cartoon Network properties. Ben 10 was one of the titles announced to be published.

Ben 10 in other media

Ben 10: Ultimate Challenge
Ben 10: Ultimate Challenge is a game show developed for television by United Kingdom-based company, Twenty Twenty, which airs on Cartoon Network in the United Kingdom, Spain, France, Italy, Netherlands, Bulgaria, the Nordic region, Hungary, Poland, Germany, Russia, Turkey, Chile, United States and the Middle East. Ultimate Challenge is a trivia show that tasks children with answering questions about all three series. Ultimate Challenge is produced by Mandy Morris and executive produced by Daniel Marlowe.

References in other shows
Ben appeared as a parody of Benjamin Franklin on the show MAD, in an episode titled "Ben 10 Franklin". Franklin was flying his kite when he was struck by a lightning bolt, gaining the Omnitrix. He used Swampfire to sign the Declaration of Independence. He also used Humongousaur to defeat the British and smash down a junior high school bully's house in revenge. He used other aliens from Alien Force and Ultimate Alien, where they have his hair and glasses.
Also in MAD, a reference to Alien Force was made with a parody of the movie Cowboys & Aliens, with many titles: "Cowboys & Alien Force", "Cowboys & Equestrians", and "Cowboys & Silly Bands". The reference was made at the beginning when Jake awakes with Ben on his side, but with Jake wearing Ben's pants and hat, with the Onmitrix on his wrist. He also used the Omnitrix to become an alien with the mix of Diamondhead, Chromastone, and Way Big to smash a cowboy.
In the South Park episode "You're Getting Old", Cartman's Mother mentions that Cartman gets upset when he does not get a present every time someone else gets a present at a party. One of the presents Cartman gets is a "Ben 10 Wrist Rocket".
The Robot Chicken episode "Hurtled from a Helicopter into a Speeding Train" shows Ben on his 14th birthday party, where he complains about his gifts given by Azmuth.
Ben 10 villains, such as the Enoch, Hex and Animo, make a brief cameo in The Secret Saturdays episode "Van Rook's Apprentice". References to Galvan Prime and Wildvine's species also appear in "Guess Who's Going to be Dinner?" and "Eterno" respectively. Both references were made by the Secret Scientist Dr Arthur Beeman, the UFOlogist for the series.	
In the Peep Show episode, "Man Jam", Jeremy jokingly refers to Ben, the boyfriend of a woman he admires, as "Ben 10" during a phone call to him.
Teenage Ben Tennyson appeared in The Official BBC Children in Need Medley in 2009

References in video games
Ben 10 is featured as a crossover character in Brawlhalla, a 2D platform fighting game. He appears as his alien forms Heatblast, Diamondhead, and Four Arms in the form of the crossover "skins" for certain playable characters.

Cartoon Network promotion

Titanic Kungfubot Offensive
The game features famous and notable Cartoon Network characters in robot-type form. Big Chill, Swampfire, a DNAlien, Kevin, Vilgax, Rath, Armodrillo, Ultimate Humongousaur, Ultimate Echo Echo, and Ultimate Big Chill appear as playable characters.

To promote the Ben 10/Generator Rex: Heroes United special, Cartoon Network updated Titanic Kungfubot Offensive, adding new bots, such as "Shocksquatch" and "Clockwork"; both of which are aliens accessible to Ben.

Cartoon Network Universe: Fusion Fall

The character design for Ben Tennyson was changed when the original Ben 10 series ended and was replaced by Alien Force. In the game, he serves as a "Player Guide" offering guide-based missions and special items.

Cartoon Network Universe: Project Exonaut
In another browser-based game entitled Cartoon Network Universe: Project Exonaut, Ben's aliens, alongside Gwen and Vilgax, appear as "exosuits". The exosuits' purpose is protecting the player and giving them unique abilities and powers. The planet Kylmyys (the home of one of Ben's aliens, Big Chill) and the Perplexhedron are featured as battle arenas. Ultimate Kevin and Alien X are currently the new exosuits for Project Exonaut representing Ben 10. The new exosuits feature Gold versions of Manus, Marceline, Mojo Jojo, and Rath.

Cartoon Network: Punch Time Explosion

Ben appears in the game as a playable character. Swampfire, Humongousaur, Big Chill, and AmpFibian appear as Ben's playable aliens. Vilgax, the archenemy of Ben Tennyson appears as a playable character for the first time. Gwen and the Vreedle Brothers are "summons" in the game. Additionally, Bellwood and the Null Void are included as battle arenas. Kevin also appears as a "summon" in the game, but is featured as a playable character on PlayStation 3, Xbox 360, and Wii versions called Cartoon Network: Punch Time Explosion XL. Kevin in Ultimate Kevin form appears in the game as a boss. The young version of Ben appears in the console version of the game as a playable character.

References

External links
Website

 
Cartoon Network franchises
Mass media franchises introduced in 2005
Man of Action Studios
Television series about parallel universes
Fiction about shapeshifting
Television franchises